Elachista atrisquamosa is a moth of the family Elachistidae which can be found in Croatia, Italy, Austria, Greece and Turkey.

References

atrisquamosa
Moths described in 1880
Moths of Asia
Moths of Europe